Diary of a Wimpy Kid is a children's novel written and illustrated by Jeff Kinney. It is the first book in the Diary of a Wimpy Kid series. The book is about a boy named Greg Heffley and his attempts to become popular in his first year of middle school.

Diary of a Wimpy Kid first appeared on FunBrain in 2004, where it was read 20 million times. The abridged hardcover adaptation was released on April 1, 2007. The book was named a New York Times bestseller, among other awards and praise. The book was adapted into a live action feature film, which released on March 19, 2010, and an animated film adaptation was released on Disney+ on December 3, 2021.

Plot
Greg Heffley, the middle school protagonist, clarifies that "this is a JOURNAL, not a diary." He then explains that he only agreed to write in one for when he is "rich and famous," and "for now, I'm stuck in middle school with a bunch of morons." Greg then discusses the old, smelly, moldy Cheese at his school. It started when someone left a piece of cheese on the blacktop, and it got moldy. If someone touches it, they have the "Cheese Touch," which they are stuck with until they pass it on by touching someone else. However, the last victim of the Cheese Touch moved away to California, and Greg hopes nobody starts it up again. He also talks about his best friend, Rowley Jefferson. Although Greg wants to be famous and explains popularity to Rowley, "it just goes in one ear and out the other with him."

Greg then introduces his family. He has a teenage brother, Rodrick, who likes to pick on him, and a little brother, a toddler named Manny, who gets everything he wants and gets away with everything he does wrong. Greg's father does not encourage his way of life — playing video games all day — rather than going outside and playing sports.

Near Halloween, Greg writes that his father likes to hide in the bushes on Halloween night and drench teenagers that walk by their driveway with a trash can full of water. Greg and Rowley decide to make a haunted house after seeing the popularity of Crossland High School's haunted house, but they only end up profiting two dollars. On Halloween night, Greg and Rowley go trick-or-treating, but are challenged by a group of teenagers who spray them with a water-filled fire extinguisher. When they get home, they are soaked with a trash can full of water by Greg's father; who mistakes them for teenagers.

Greg fails a State Capitals test after a girl named Patty Farrell reminds the teacher that he needs to take down the map of the United States because it has the state capitals on it. At home, Greg's mother forces him into auditioning for the school play (based on The Wizard of Oz). Greg lands the role of a tree, while Patty Farrell is cast as Dorothy, the protagonist of the novel. During the show's performance, Greg becomes too nervous to sing, confusing the other trees. Patty gets frustrated, and Greg starts throwing apples at her. The other trees join in, and while Greg's mother is disappointed, Greg ends up enjoying the play due to him getting back at Patty.

After getting bad presents for Christmas, Greg decides to play a game with Rowley in which Rowley must ride a Big Wheel down a hill while Greg tries to knock him off with a football. On one of Greg's tries, the ball goes under the front wheel, which causes Rowley to fall off and break his left arm. When Rowley goes to school with a plaster cast, the girls take care of him (carrying his books, feeding him food), which makes Greg jealous.

Greg decides to join the Safety Patrols at his school, hoping that he will be able to control the other kids. He gets Rowley to sign up as well and enjoys the benefits of being in the Safety Patrols, such as getting free hot chocolate. He tries to get a spot in the school's newspaper as a cartoonist and teams up with Rowley. Greg comes up with a strip called Zoo-Wee Mama! Eventually, Greg starts wanting to do other strips, but Rowley wants to continue with Zoo-Wee Mama! Greg submits his comics to the teacher and ends up getting the cartoonist job. However, the teacher completely changes Greg's comic, even making his character a "curious student" instead of a "cretin."

After an incident where Greg chases some kindergartners with a worm on a stick and is mistaken for Rowley, Rowley gets suspended from the Safety Patrols for a week. However, after it gets cleared up that Greg was the real culprit, Rowley is re-hired and promoted while Greg is fired.

Greg notices that the school year is coming to a close and tries to get on the yearbook's Class Favorites page. He plans to go for "Class Clown," but his plans do not work out. At lunch, he gets an issue of the school newspaper and learns that Rowley is the new cartoonist, with his Zoo-Wee Mama! strip left unchanged.

Greg confronts Rowley for not even listing him as co-creator and hogging all the fame. As they argue, the teenagers who chased them at Halloween appear and force Greg and Rowley to eat the Cheese. Greg gets out of it by saying he's lactose intolerant even though he isn't, while Rowley is forced to eat the whole thing. The next day, when everyone notices that the Cheese is gone, Greg takes the fall for Rowley and lies by saying that he threw it away. Greg reconciles with Rowley and lets people think that he has the Cheese Touch.

The book concludes with Greg getting his yearbook, seeing Rowley on the "Class Clown" page, and throwing it in the garbage.

Background

In May 2004, FunBrain and Jeff Kinney released an online version of Diary of a Wimpy Kid. The website made daily entries until June 2005. The online book became an instant hit, and had received approximately 20 million views by 2007. Many online readers requested a printed version. At the 2006 New York Comic-Con Kinney proposed Diary of a Wimpy Kid to Charles Kochman, Editorial Director of the ComicArts division of Abrams Books, who purchased the rights to the book. According to Kochman, the two initially conceived it as a book for adults, believing it would appeal to audiences similar to that of the TV series The Wonder Years. Kochman brought it before the Abrams publishing board, which convinced Kinney and Kochman that it would be better aimed toward children. In 2007, Diary of a Wimpy Kid, an abridged version of the original online book, was published.

Main Characters

Gregory Heffley

The main character, Greg, has trouble with family, friends, and his local middle school. He is very concerned about how popular he is at school, and he daydreams a lot about being rich and famous when he grows up. He tries to fit in at his school, but usually he does not succeed. Facing many challenges, Greg attempts to handle them very creatively, but unfortunately his antics often backfire on him.

Rowley Jefferson
Greg's best friend has a larger than average frame. He is always willing to do what Greg tells him, including dangerous stunts. Rowley goes on vacations all the time, which annoys Greg. Rowley is a loyal friend, but he sometimes behaves in an immature or childish manner. He also dresses in an unusual way.

Manny Heffley
Greg's "spoiled" little brother, a three-year-old toddler. He never gets in trouble no matter what, even when he really deserves it. Manny is not yet potty trained.
Rodrick Heffley
Rodrick is Greg's teenage brother and he never misses a chance to be cruel to Greg. He is known for sleeping excessively in the morning and for his rebellious attitude. Rodrick is part of a basement band (garage band in the movies) called "Löded Diper". Rodrick will do anything to embarrass Greg and will even cause problems for Manny to make everyone's life miserable.

Sequels

Diary of a Wimpy Kid is the first book in an ongoing franchise. A total of seventeen Wimpy Kid books have been released, the sequels to the first book are: Rodrick Rules (2008) which was listed on the New York Times Best Sellers list for 117 weeks, The Last Straw (2009) which was on the New York Times Best Sellers list for 65 weeks, peaking at number one, Dog Days (2009) which was ranked at number one on the New York Times Best Sellers List for all 25 weeks of inclusion, making it the #1 best selling book of 2009, The Ugly Truth (2010), Cabin Fever (2011), The Third Wheel (2012), Hard Luck (2013), The Long Haul (2014), Old School (2015), Double Down (2016), The Getaway (2017), The Meltdown (2018), Wrecking Ball (2019), The Deep End (2020), Big Shot (2021), and Diper Överlöde (2022).

Reception
The book won the Blue Peter Book Award 2012, revealed live on British kids channel CBBC on March 1, 2012. In 2012 it was ranked number 76 on a list of the top 100 children's novels published by School Library Journal.

Adaptations

A film adaptation, Diary of a Wimpy Kid, was released by 20th Century Fox on March 19, 2010. The film stars Zachary Gordon as Greg Heffley, Robert Capron as Rowley Jefferson, Steve Zahn as Frank Heffley (Dad), Rachael Harris as Susan Heffley (Mom), Devon Bostick as Rodrick Heffley, Chloë Grace Moretz as Angie Steadman, and Connor & Owen Fielding as Manny Heffley, Greg's brother. It would later go on to spawn three sequels.

Another film adaptation, this time animated, serving as a reboot of the film series was released on December 3, 2021 exclusively on Disney+.

References

External links

 
 Diary of a Wimpy Kid on FunBrain.com
 Diary of a Wimpy Kid - Channel One News Interview with Jeff Kinney on Channel One News
 The Wonderful World of Wimpy - Parade magazine An interview with Jeff Kinney in Parade Magazine

2007 American novels
Diary of a Wimpy Kid
Novels by Jeff Kinney
American young adult novels
American novels adapted into films
2007 children's books
Works based on Internet-based works
Amulet Books books